Monomorium antarcticum is an ant of the family Formicidae, endemic to New Zealand. Also known as the southern ant, this is likely New Zealand's most common native ant species. Because it is highly variable in size (3–5mm), colour, and colony structure, it is possible that it consists of a complex of closely related species. It has a generalist diet, including small arthropods, nectar, and seeds, and it also tends aphids, scale insects, and mealybugs to obtain honeydew.

Distribution and habitat 
Monomorium antarcticum is endemic to New Zealand, found across the North and South Islands, as well as Stewart Island and smaller offshore islands, the Three Kings Islands, the Chatham Islands, the Kermandec Islands and the Austral Islands.

Monomorium antarcticum are found throughout many habitats including native forest, grasslands, wetlands, pastureland, household gardens as well as horticultural and industrial habitats.

There is some evidence to suggest that the range of Monomorium antarcticum in urban habitats may be restricted due to competition with exotic ant species, at least in northern parts of New Zealand.

Identification 
Worker specimens are variable in size, usually 3-5mm in length, with head width varying from 0.60-0.88mm. The antennae have 12 segments, with a three segmented club. Metanotal groove present, either distinctly or weakly impressed. Spines on propodeum are either blunt or absent. Colour highly variable across colonies (but usually consistent within colonies), from orange, light to dark brown and black.

References

antarcticum
Ants of New Zealand
Endemic fauna of New Zealand
Insects described in 1858
Taxa named by Frederick Smith (entomologist)
Hymenoptera of New Zealand
Endemic insects of New Zealand